The 2019 Bonnaroo Music Festival, the eighteenth consecutive edition of the festival, was held June 13 to 16, 2019, at the Great Stage Park Manchester, Tennessee. The tickets were sold out and it was projected that 80,000 people attended the festival across the weekend. The festival was headlined by two sets by Phish, Childish Gambino, Post Malone, Odesza, and The Lumineers.

Set lists
Here are the lists of songs performed at the 2019 Bonnaroo by the headliners:
{{Hidden
| headercss = background: #add8e6; font-size: 100%; width: 100%;  
| contentcss = text-align: left; font-size: 100%; width: 100%; 
| header = Phish (Friday set)
| content =

"Carini"
"Down with Disease"
"Say It to Me S.A.N.T.O.S."
"Everything's Right"
"Mercury"
"Tweezer"
"Also sprach Zarathustra, op. 30"
"Steam"
"Martian Monster"
"More"
"Harry Hood"
"Character Zero"

Encore
"Possum"
"Tweezer Reprise"
}}

{{Hidden
| headercss = background: #add8e6; font-size: 100%; width: 100%;  
| contentcss = text-align: left; font-size: 100%; width: 100%; 
| header = Phish (Sunday sets)
| content =

Set 1
"Set Your Soul Free"
"Blaze On"
"Death Don't Hurt Very Long"
"Reba"
"Free"
"Sand"
"Wolfman's Brother"
"Cavern"

Set 2
"Mike's Song"
"Fluffhead"
"Twist"
"Weekapaug Groove"
"No Men in No Man's Land"
"Fuego"
"Ghost"
"Bathtub Gin"

Encore
"Wilson"
"First Tube"
}}
{{Hidden
| headercss = background: #add8e6; font-size: 100%; width: 100%;  
| contentcss = text-align: left; font-size: 100%; width: 100%; 
| header = The Lumineers
| content =

"Sleep on the Floor"
"Cleopatra"
"Life in the City"
"Submarines"
"Leader of the Landslide"
"Angela"
"Flowers in Your Hair"
"Ho Hey"
"Slow It Down"
"Ophelia"
"Gloria"
"Big Parade"
"Gun Song"
"Donna"
"This Must Be the Place (Naive Melody)" (with Rayland Baxter)
"Stubborn Love"

Encore
"Walls (Circus)"
}}

Line-ups
The line-up for the 2019 festival was announced five months prior, on January 8, 2019. Esquire called the line-up as "the weirdest one in years", criticized Post Malone and two Phish's headlining spots.

The information was obtained from BrooklynVegan website. Artists listed from earliest to latest set times.

Thursday, June 13
This Tent: Donna Missal, Jack Harlow, All Them Witches, Rolling Blackouts Coastal Fever, The Comet Is Coming, SunSquabi
That Tent: Peach Pit, Caroline Rose, Grand Ole Opry, The Nude Party, Magic City Hippies, Saba
The Other: Dorfex Bos, Hekler, Eprom, 12th Planet, Space Jesus B2B Eprom B2B Shlump
Who Stage: Kalu & the Electric Joint, Drax Project, Mk.gee, Bülow, Friday Pilots Club, Evan Giia
Silent Disco: Case Bloom, Shlump, DJ Mel

Friday, June 14
What Stage: Rival Sons, Catfish and the Bottlemen, The Avett Brothers, Childish Gambino, Phish
Which Stage: The Teskey Brothers, Nahko and Medicine for the People, AJR, GRiZ, Solange, Brockhampton
This Tent: Tyla Yaweh, Cherry Glazerr, Parquet Courts, K.Flay, Gojira, Beach House, GRiZ Super Jam
That Tent: Monsieur Periné, Las Cafeteras, Ibeyi, Anoushka Shankar, Courtney Barnett, Deafheaven, Girl Talk
The Other: Crooked Colours, Mersiv, Ducky, Medasin, Jade Cicada, Liquid Stranger, Nghtmre, RL Grime
Who Stage: Ida Mae, Lola Kirke, Pinky Pinky, Los Colognes, SOAK, Illiterate Light, King Nun

Saturday, June 15
What Stage: The Record Company, Maren Morris, Hozier, Odesza, Post Malone
Which Stage: Rubblebucket, Hippo Campus, Juice Wrld, Kacey Musgraves, The National, The Lonely Island
This Tent: Little Simz, Chelsea Cutler, Bishop Briggs, Quinn XCII, Jim James, Clairo, Gucci Mane
That Tent: Deva Mahal, Ruston Kelly, Unknown Mortal Orchestra, Shovels & Rope, John Prine, Joe Russo's Almost Dead
The Other: DJ Mel, Memba, Whipped Cream, SNBRN, TOKiMONSTA, Space Jesus, Gramatik, Zhu
Who Stage: Honey Harper, Sego, Delacey, The New Respects, Ximena Sariñana, Liily, Republican Hair

Sunday, June 16
What Stage: Trampled by Turtles, Brandi Carlile, The Lumineers, Phish (two sets)
Which Stage: Ripe, The Soul Rebels, Hobo Johnson and the Lovemakers, Walk the Moon, Cardi B
This Tent: Faye Webster, Two Feet, The Lemon Twigs, Lil Dicky, King Princess
That Tent: Kikagaku Moyo, Bombino, Princess, The Wood Brothers, Mac DeMarco
The Other: Iglooghost, Cid, Dombresky, AC Slater, G Jones, Illenium
Who Stage: Sun Seeker, Jared & The Mill, Patrick Droney, I Dont Know How But They Found Me, Super Doppler, Golden West

References

External links 
Official Bonnaroo site

Bonnaroo Music Festival by year
Bonnaroo Music Festival